Udea is a genus of snout moths in the subfamily Spilomelinae of the family Crambidae. The genus was erected by Achille Guenée in 1845. The currently known 215 species are present on all continents except Antarctica. About 41 species are native to Hawaii.

Systematics

The genus is placed in the tribe Udeini, where it is closest related to the genera Mnesictena, Deana and Udeoides. In the past, Mnesictena was included in Udea, but it is currently considered a separate genus comprising seven species.

The North American, European and African Udea species have been treated in several studies, and a number of species groups has been proposed (see below).

Species

Udea ferrugalis species group:
Udea accolalis (Zeller, 1867)
Udea azorensis Meyer, Nuss & Speidel, 1997
Udea delineatalis (Walker in Melliss, 1875)
Udea exigualis (Wileman, 1911)
Udea ferrugalis (Hübner, 1796)
Udea heterodoxa (Meyrick, 1899)
Udea kirinyaga Mally in Mally et al., 2022
Udea liopis (Meyrick, 1899)
Udea lugubralis (Leech, 1889)
Udea maderensis (Bethune-Baker, 1894)
Udea meruensis Mally in Mally et al., 2022
Udea momella Mally in Mally et al., 2022
Udea montensis Mutuura, 1954
Udea namaquana Karisch & Mally in Mally et al., 2022
Udea nicholsae Mally in Mally et al., 2022
Udea nordmani (Rebel, 1935)
Udea profundalis (Packard, 1873)
Udea pyranthes (Meyrick, 1899)
Udea rubigalis (Guenée, 1854)
Udea rusticalis (Barnes & McDunnough, 1914)
Udea stationalis Yamanaka, 1988
Udea swezeyi (Zimmerman, 1951)

Udea itysalis species group:
Udea abstrusa Munroe, 1966
Udea beringialis Munroe, 1966
Udea brevipalpis Munroe, 1966
Udea cacuminicola Munroe, 1966)
Udea costalis (Eversmann, 1852)
Udea derasa Munroe, 1966
Udea itysalis (Walker, 1859)
Udea livida Munroe, 1966
Udea radiosalis (Möschler, 1883)
Udea tachdirtalis (Zerny, 1935)
Udea turmalis (Grote, 1881)

Udea numeralis species group:
Udea ardekanalis Amsel, 1961
Udea bipunctalis (Herrich-Schäffer, 1848)
Udea confinalis (Lederer, 1858)
Udea cyanalis (La Harpe, 1855)
Udea exalbalis (Caradja, 1916)
Udea fimbriatralis (Duponchel, 1833)
Udea fulvalis (Hübner, 1809)
Udea hageni Viette, 1952
Udea institalis (Hübner, 1819)
Udea languidalis (Eversmann, 1842)
Udea lutealis (Hübner, 1809)
Udea numeralis (Hübner, 1796)
Udea olivalis (Denis & Schiffermüller, 1775)
Udea praepetalis (Lederer, 1869)
Udea ruckdescheli Mally, Segerer & Nuss, 2016
Udea tritalis (Christoph, 1881)
Udea zernyi (Klima in Zerny, 1940)

Udea alpinalis species group:
Udea alpinalis (Denis & Schiffermüller, 1775)
Udea altaica (Zerny, 1914)
Udea austriacalis (Herrich-Schäffer, 1851)
Udea bourgognealis Leraut, 1996
Udea carniolica Huemer & Tarmann, 1989
Udea cretacea (Filipjev, 1925)
Udea donzelalis (Guenée, 1854)
Udea juldusalis (Zerny, 1914)
Udea murinalis (Fischer von Röslerstamm, 1842)
Udea nebulalis (Hübner, 1796)
Udea plumbalis (Zerny, 1914)
Udea rhododendronalis (Duponchel, 1834)
Udea uliginosalis (Stephens, 1834)

Udea decrepitalis species group:
Udea decrepitalis (Herrich-Schäffer, 1848)
Udea hamalis (Thunberg, 1792)
Udea inquinatalis (Lienig & Zeller, 1846)
Udea prunalis (Denis & Schiffermüller, 1775)

Species unplaced in any species group:
Udea absolutalis (Dyar, 1913)
Udea aenigmatica (Heinrich, 1931)
Udea affinialis (Zerny, 1914)
Udea afghanalis (Amsel, 1970)
Udea aksualis (Caradja, 1928)
Udea alaskalis (Gibson, 1920)
Udea albipunctalis Dognin, 1905
Udea albostriata Zhang & Li, 2016
Udea amitina (Butler, 1883)
Udea angustalis (Dognin, 1905)
Udea annectans Munroe, 1974
Udea argoscelis (Meyrick, 1888)
Udea asychanalis (Druce, 1899)
Udea auratalis (Warren, 1895)
Udea aurora (Butler, 1881)
Udea autoclesalis (Walker, 1859)
Udea berberalis (Barnes & McDunnough, 1918)
Udea binoculalis (Hampson, 1904)
Udea brontias (Meyrick, 1899)
Udea bryochloris (Meyrick, 1899)
Udea caliginosalis (Ragonot, 1894)
Udea calliastra (Meyrick, 1899)
Udea caminopis (Meyrick, 1899)
Udea capsifera (Meyrick, 1933)
Udea cataphaea (Meyrick, 1899)
Udea chalcophanes (Meyrick, 1899)
Udea chloropis (Meyrick, 1899)
Udea chytropa (Meyrick, 1899)
Udea cinerea (Butler, 1883)
Udea conisalias (Meyrick, 1899)
Udea constricta (Butler, 1882)
Udea conubialis Yamanaka, 1972
Udea coranialis Munroe, 1967
Udea costiplaga (Dognin, 1913)
Udea crambialis (Druce, 1899)
Udea curvata Zhang & Li, 2016
Udea decoripennis Munroe, 1967
Udea defectalis (Sauber, 1899)
Udea despecta (Butler, 1877)
Udea detersalis (Walker, 1866)
Udea diopsalis (Hampson, 1913)
Udea dracontias (Meyrick, 1899)
Udea dryadopa (Meyrick, 1899)
Udea elutalis (Denis & Schiffermüller, 1775)
Udea endopyra (Meyrick, 1899)
Udea endotrichialis (Hampson, 1918)
Udea ennychioides (Butler, 1881)
Udea ephippias (Meyrick, 1899)
Udea eucrena (Meyrick, 1888)
Udea ferrealis (Hampson, 1900)
Udea flavofimbriata (Moore, 1888)
Udea fulcrialis (Sauber, 1899)
Udea fumipennis (Warren, 1892)
Udea fusculalis (Hampson, 1899)
Udea gigantalis Dognin, 1912
Udea grisealis Inoue, Yamanaka & Sasaki, 2008
Udea helioxantha (Meyrick, 1899)
Udea helviusalis (Walker, 1859)
Udea hyalistis (Lower, 1902)
Udea ialis (Walker, 1859)
Udea ichinosawana (Matsumura, 1925)
Udea illineatalis (Dognin, 1904)
Udea incertalis (Caradja in Caradja & Meyrick, 1937)
Udea indistincta (Butler, 1883)
Udea indistinctalis Warren, 1892
Udea inferioralis (Walker, 1866)
Udea inhospitalis Warren, 1892
Udea intermedia Inoue, Yamanaka & Sasaki, 2008
Udea karagaialis (Caradja, 1916)
Udea khorassanalis (Amsel, 1950)
Udea kusnezovi Sinev, 2008
Udea lagunalis (Schaus, 1913)
Udea lampadias (Meyrick, 1904)
Udea latipennalis (Caradja, 1928)
Udea lenta (Meyrick, 1936)
Udea lerautalis Tautel, 2014
Udea litorea (Butler, 1883)
Udea mandronalis (Walker, 1859)
Udea mechedalis (Amsel, 1950)
Udea melanephra (Hampson, 1913)
Udea melanopis (Meyrick, 1899)
Udea melanosticta (Butler, 1883)
Udea metasema (Meyrick, 1899)
Udea micacea (Butler, 1881)
Udea minnehaha (Pryer, 1877)
Udea montanalis (Schaus, 1912)
Udea monticolens (Butler, 1882)
Udea nea (Strand, 1918)
Udea nebulatalis Inoue, Yamanaka & Sasaki, 2008
Udea nigrescens (Butler, 1881)
Udea nigripunctata Warren, 1892
Udea nigrostigmalis Warren, 1896
Udea nomophilodes (Hampson, 1913)
Udea nordeggensis (McDunnough, 1929)
Udea ochreocapitalis (Ragonot, 1894)
Udea ochropera (Hampson, 1913)
Udea octosignalis (Hulst, 1886)
Udea ommatias (Meyrick, 1899)
Udea orbicentralis (Christoph, 1881)
Udea pachygramma (Meyrick, 1899)
Udea paghmanalis (Amsel, 1970)
Udea phaealis (Hampson, 1899)
Udea phaethontia (Meyrick, 1899)
Udea phyllostegia (Swezey, 1946)
Udea planalis (South in Leech & South, 1901)
Udea platyleuca (Meyrick, 1899)
Udea poasalis (Schaus, 1912)
Udea poliostolalis (Hampson, 1918)
Udea praefulvalis (Amsel, 1970)
Udea proximalis Inoue, Yamanaka & Sasaki, 2008
Udea pseudocrocealis (South in Leech & South, 1901)
Udea psychropa (Meyrick, 1899)
Udea punctiferalis (South in Leech & South, 1901)
Udea punoalis Munroe, 1967
Udea pyraustiformis (Toll, 1948)
Udea ragonotii (Butler, 1883)
Udea renalis Moore, 1888
Udea russispersalis (Zerny, 1914)
Udea sabulosalis Warren, 1892
Udea saxifragae (McDunnough, 1935)
Udea schaeferi (Caradja in Caradja & Meyrick, 1937)
Udea scoparialis (Hampson, 1899)
Udea scorialis (Zeller, 1847)
Udea secernalis (Möschler, 1890)
Udea secticostalis (Hampson, 1913)
Udea sheppardi (McDunnough, 1929)
Udea simplicella (La Harpe, 1861)
Udea sobrinalis (Guenée, 1854)
Udea soratalis Munroe, 1967
Udea stellata (Butler, 1883)
Udea stigmatalis (Wileman, 1911)
Udea subplanalis (Caradja in Caradja & Meyrick, 1937)
Udea suisharyonensis (Strand, 1918)
Udea suralis (Schaus, 1933)
Udea tenoalis Munroe, 1974
Udea testacea (Butler, 1879)
Udea tetragramma (J. F. G. Clarke, 1965)
Udea thermantis (Meyrick, 1899)
Udea thermantoidis (Swezey, 1913)
Udea thoonalis (Walker, 1859)
Udea thyalis (Walker, 1859)
Udea torvalis (Möschler, 1864)
Udea umbriferalis (Hampson, 1918)
Udea uralica Slamka, 2013
Udea vacunalis (Grote, 1881)
Udea vastalis (Christoph in Romanoff, 1887)
Udea violae (Swezey, 1933)
Udea viridalis (Dognin, 1904)
Udea washingtonalis (Grote, 1882)

Former species
Udea catilualis (Hampson, 1900), synonymized with Udea numeralis
Udea conquisitalis (Guenee, 1849), transferred to the Glaphyriinae genus Evergestis
Udea epicoena (Meyrick, 1937), a synonym of Udea ferrugalis
Udea illutalis (Guenée, 1854), a synonym of Udea numeralis
Udea infuscalis Zeller, 1852, transferred to the Pyraustinae genus Lirabotys
Udea melanostictalis (Hampson in Poulton, 1916), transferred to the Pyraustinae genus Achyra
Udea pauperalis (Staudinger, 1879), transferred to the Pyraustinae genus Pyrausta
Udea perfervidalis (Hampson, 1900), transferred to the Spilomelinae genus Metasia
Udea sviridovi Bolshakov, 2002, synonymized with Udea exalbalis

References

 
Crambidae genera

Taxa named by Achille Guenée